Maleh, el Maleh, el Malih, el Melah, etc. ('salty') may refer to:

Rivers
Wadi el Maleh, wadi (stream) in West Bank
Oued el Melah, wadi in Tunisia, Gafsa and Tozeur governorates 
Oued el Maleh, wadi in Aïn Témouchent Province Algeria

Populated places
El Malah District, Aïn Témouchent Province, Algeria
El Malah,  municipality in El Malah District, Algeria
Al-Malih, Syrian village

Other uses
Maleh (surname)

See also
Sayh al Malih, place in Oman
Khirbet al-Malih ('ruins of al Malih'), Palestinian hamlet in West Bank
Malich (disambiguation)